Bernhard Herrmann (born 13 January 1966) is a German politician for Alliance 90/The Greens and since 2021 member of the Bundestag, the federal diet.

Life and politics 

Herrmann was born 1966 in the East German town of Luckenwalde and was elected to the Bundestag in 2021.

References 

Living people
1966 births
Members of the Bundestag 2021–2025
21st-century German politicians
People from Luckenwalde